The Saro A17 Cutty Sark was a British amphibious aircraft from the period between World War I and World War II, built by the British firm Saunders-Roe (also known as SARO).  The aircraft was named after the ship Cutty Sark, rather than the garment or the fictional witch.

Development
In 1928, Sir Alliot Verdon Roe sold Avro.  He bought an interest in S. E. Saunders, flying boat manufacturers based at Cowes, Isle of Wight, southern England; the company was renamed Saunders-Roe.  The A17 Cutty Sark was the new company's first design.  It was a shoulder-winged twin-engined four-seat amphibian monoplane with an all-metal hull and plywood covered wings.  The above-wing pylon-mounted engines could easily be changed, and a variety of different engines were used to power Cutty Sarks, including 104 hp Cirrus Hermes Mk 1s and 120 hp de Havilland Gipsy IIs.  The Saro A19 Cloud was developed from this design.

Only 12 Cutty Sarks were built, and none lasted long in service, but the type nevertheless saw service with many users in the United Kingdom, Australia, Canada, New Zealand, China, Japan and the Dominican Republic.

Production aircraft
 A17/1 : The prototype G-AAIP was first flown 4 July 1929. Bought by Captain Campbell Shaw and Flight Lieutenant Tommy Rose for Isle of Man Air Services. Returned to Cowes in 1933 after being damaged by floating timber.  
 A17/2 :  VH-UNV was exported to Australia by Matthews Aviation flying the Bass Strait between Melbourne and Tasmania from May 1930.  On 8 November 1931 the aircraft was driven by wind into a pier at St. Kilda, and Mr E. Lloyd, a passenger who attempted to assist, was killed by a propeller.  In 1935 it was sold to Pioneer Air Services. In 1937 it was sold to Keith Caldwell, a young barnstorming pilot from Lindfield NSW (not to be confused with the NZ WWII fighter ace of the same name); on 15 October 1937, at the same time as he joined Qantas as a pilot, Caldwell sold VH-UNV for £700 to the airline as a trainer.  It was written off after landing on water with the undercarriage extended on 5 April 1938.
 A17/3 : a.k.a. "L3". Sold to the RNZAF. It operated from Hobsonville, Auckland, for the next six years. After 221 hours and 5 minutes flying time it was judged worn out beyond economic repair. L3 made its last flight on 23 November 1936, after which it served as an instructional airframe. It was scrapped in 1939.
 A17/4 :  G-AAVX before being sold to Singapore as VR-SAA in 1930. 
 A17/5 : G-ABBC named "Progress I" operated out of Blackpool to the Isle of Man by British Amphibious Airlines. Attempts to replace it with an A.19 Cloud after 1933 were blocked due to SARO's decision to operate an airline from the Isle of Man.
 A17/6 : Acquired by the Royal Air Force as S1575.
 A17/7 : Sold to Hong Kong as VR-HAY
 A17/8 : Served in the Kwangsi Air Force in China, but was returned to Britain as G-AETI.
 A17/9 : Initially registered G-ABVF then exported to Japan.
 A17/10 : Registered G-ACDP to Air Service Training Ltd., used by No 3 E & RFTS until 1942.
 A17/11 : Registered G-ACDR to Air Service Training Ltd., used by No 3 E & RFTS until 1942.
 A17/12 : Registered G-ADAF. This may be the machine exported to the Dominican Republic in 1935, and written off in 1942.

Operators

Military operators
 
Kwangsi Air Force

Dominican Air Force - One aircraft.
 
Royal New Zealand Air Force 
 
Royal Air Force

Specifications (A.17M – Genet Major engines)

See also

References

Notes

Bibliography
Jackson, A.J. British Civil Aircraft 1919–1972: Volume III. London:Putnam, 1988. .
London, Peter. Saunders and Saro Aircraft since 1917. London: Putnam, 1988. 

1920s British patrol aircraft
Amphibious aircraft
Cutty Sark
High-wing aircraft
Aircraft first flown in 1929
Cruciform tail aircraft
Twin piston-engined tractor aircraft